A Cambodian Spring is a 2017 British documentary film directed and produced by Christopher Kelly, focusing on a conflict over plans to develop the Boeung Kak lake in the Cambodian capital of Phnom Penh. The film was premiered at the Hot Docs festival in Toronto, Canada in May 2017. It was released theatrically in the United Kingdom and Ireland on May 18, 2018.

Synopsis
The film chronicles the struggle to prevent the development of the lake by the government backed and World Bank funded Shukaku Inc., which would involve filling the lake with sand and evicting the families who live around it. Spurning the offered compensation, locals protest the development, led by three activists: the Buddhist monk The Venerable Luon Sovath, and housing activists, Toul Srey Pov and Tep Vanny.

Critical response
On review aggregator website Rotten Tomatoes, the film holds an approval rating of 95% based on 20 reviews, and an average rating of 7.4/10. Writing in Time Out, Phil de Semlyen wrote "For all its sombre revelations, 'A Cambodian Spring' exudes a powerful sense of possibility.".

It was nominated for outstanding Debut by a British, Writer, Director or Producer at the 2019 BAFTAs.

Soundtrack

The soundtrack was composed by electronic music producer James Holden and released on his own Border Community label.

See also
Shukaku Inc.#Boeung Kak lake development

References

External links
 
 Official website

2016 films
British documentary films
2016 documentary films
2010s English-language films
2010s British films